The 2017 UK Championship was a professional ranking snooker tournament that took place from 28 November to 10 December 2017 at the Barbican Centre in York, England. The event was the 41st edition of the UK Championship, first held in 1977, organised by the World Professional Billiards and Snooker Association. It was the eleventh ranking and first Triple Crown event of the 2017/2018 season. The event saw 128 players compete, with no qualification round. The prize fund was a total of £850,000, with £170,000 received by the winner.

Ronnie O'Sullivan equalled Steve Davis's record of six UK titles by defeating Shaun Murphy 10–5 in the final. This was O'Sullivan's 31st ranking and 18th Triple Crown title, also equalling Stephen Hendry's record for most Triple Crown championships. Mark Selby was the defending champion, but he was defeated by Scott Donaldson 3–6 in the last 64. Michael White won the highest break prize, with a 142 made in the second round. The event followed the Northern Ireland Open, and preceded the Scottish Open.

Prize fund 
The championship's prize money was identical to that of the previous year's event, with the event winner earning £170,000. The highest  prize of £5,000 was won by Michael White, who completed a 142 break during his second round match with Matthew Selt. The "rolling 147 prize" for a maximum break stood at £15,000, but went unclaimed. The breakdown of prize money is shown below:

 Last 64: £5,000
 Last 32: £10,000
 Last 16: £15,000
 Quarter-final: £22,500
 Semi-final: £35,000
 Runner-up: £75,000
 Winner: £170,000
 Highest break: £5,000
 Total: £850,000

Tournament summary 
The 2017 UK Championship was the eleventh ranking and first Triple Crown event of the 2017/2018 snooker season. The event saw 128 players from the World Snooker Tour take part, with all matches until the final being played as best of 11  matches, with the final being played as best of 19 frame match, held over two sessions. The first round of the competition started on 28 November 2017, with players being seeded according to their world rankings.

Early rounds (first–fourth round) 

The first round saw few upsets, with most of the highest ranked players progressing. However, Ding Junhui (second seed) was defeated by world number 130 Leo Fernandez 6–5, despite having led 5–1, and having a chance to win the match in frame 7. Fernandez had only recently returned to the professional circuit after serving a 15-month ban for a corruption charge. Elsewhere, Ali Carter (11th seed) lost 6–2 to Jimmy White (118). Despite Carter having been ahead 2–1, White won the next five frames to progress. Another upset saw Lyu Haotian (104) defeat Anthony Hamilton (25) 6–1.

The second round of the tournament was played from 2–3 December and began with defending champion, and world number one Mark Selby losing to Scott Donaldson (64) 3–6. Donaldson had lost all 10 matches of his season prior to the tournament, won six of the last seven frames to win the match, having trailed 0–2.
The remaining top 16 players progressed through the second round, with the lowest ranked player to proceed being Lyu – ranked 104 – who defeated Peter Ebdon 6–3 to reach the third round.

Round three was played between the remaining 32 players, from 4–5 December 2017, seeing more top 16 players be defeated. Graeme Dott (30) overcame Judd Trump (3) 6–2, despite trailing 2–0. Dott compiled five 50+ breaks, and won the next six frames. Hoatian who had defeated Hamilton and Ebdon in prior round, defeated Marco Fu (8) 6–4. Both Neil Robertson (9) and Mark Williams (16) were also defeated at this stage, 5–6. Robertson was defeated by Mark Joyce (41), and caused him to miss the 2018 Masters, after dropping out of the top 16, thanks to the loss. Sunny Akani (87) whitewashed Barry Hawkins (10) 6–0, with Hawkins commenting after the match that he was "in a state of shock" with the result, commenting on both Akani's performance, and the poor playing conditions. Williams lost to fellow Welshman Ryan Day (17), having been ahead at 4–1.

Round four saw the remaining sixteen players play from 6–7 December 2017. Only four top 16 seeded players reached the last 16 of the tournament – John Higgins (4), Shaun Murphy (5), Mark Allen (6) and Ronnie O'Sullivan (7). This was the fewest top 16 seeds to reach that stage in the tournament's 40-year history. Higgins played Mark King (21), where he was defeated 5–6. King trailed at both 2–4, and 4–5 but won the match despite making a highest break of just 69. Murphy would defeat Ricky Walden 6–1, with Walden only winning frame four. Mark Allen lost to Joe Perry (22) 6–4. O'Sullivan played Sunny Akani in this round, winning the match 6–5, despite being 4–5 behind. O'Sullivan commented after the match that he felt as though he had "robbed" Akani of the win, describing him as being unlucky.

Later stages (quarter-finals–final) 
The quarter-finals took place on 8 December 2017 on two tables. Shaun Murphy completed a 6–1 victory over Mark King. Post-match, both Murphy and King commented on the audience, with a man being removed for snoring and a woman for talking during the match. Ronnie O'Sullivan defeated Martin Gould 6–3, after leading 5–0.

Stephen Maguire defeated Joe Perry 6–3 to set up a semi-final match with O'Sullivan, in a repeat of the 2007 UK Championship final. After beating Maguire in 2007, O'Sullivan commented that Maguire would "dominate for a decade". Reacting to the match from 10 years prior, Maguire stated that O'Sullivan "talks some bollocks", having not dominated the game since that match. Ryan Day also overcame Mark Joyce in a deciding frame 6–5.

The semi-finals were played on 9 December 2017. The first semi-final saw O'Sullivan defeat Maguire 6–4. O'Sullivan took a 4–0 lead at the interval, before Maguire won four of the next five frames, with O'Sullivan winning the match in frame ten. The second semi-final saw Shaun Murphy overcome Ryan Day 6–3. Murphy would take a 5–1 lead, before losing the next two frames, and winning the match in frame nine.

The final was played as best of 19 frames, over two sessions on 10 December 2017. Both O'Sullivan and Murphy had met in the final of the 2017 Champion of Champions the month prior, with Murphy winning 10–8. Murphy and O'Sullivan would share the first session 4–4, despite Murphy being behind at 2–4. In the second session, O'Sullivan put together six 50+ breaks including two  to win six of the next seven frames to win the match 10–5, winning five frames in a row.

Post match, pundit John Parrott described O'Sullivan as "a genius of a juggernaut", commenting on the impressiveness of the clinical win. The win would be O'Sullivan's sixth UK Championship victory equalling that achieved by Steve Davis, and his 18th Triple Crown victory overall, equalling the record set by Stephen Hendry.

Main draw 
Below is the results for the tournament. Players in bold denote winners of matches. The player's seedings are based on the player's world ranking prior to the tournament.

Top half

Section 1

Section 2

Section 3

Section 4

Bottom half

Section 5

Section 6

Section 7

Section 8

Finals

Final

Century breaks 
A total of 99 breaks were made at the event, the highest of which – a 142 – was made by Michael White in the second round.

 142, 103  Michael White
 138, 128, 122, 111, 110  Ryan Day
 137, 128, 114  Joe Perry
 137  Judd Trump
 135, 134, 127, 119, 104, 101, 100  Mark Allen
 135, 129, 123, 114, 104  Shaun Murphy
 135, 108, 101  Martin Gould
 134, 120, 108  Li Hang
 134, 103  Yan Bingtao
 134, 101  Mark King
 132, 121, 117, 111, 107, 106, 105, 104, 103, 103  Ronnie O'Sullivan
 130, 112, 110  Liang Wenbo
 130, 106, 101  Mark Joyce
 130  Dominic Dale
 129, 128, 127, 117, 116  Stephen Maguire
 129, 128, 126, 124, 118, 105, 102, 101  Neil Robertson
 129, 117  Scott Donaldson
 129  Chris Wakelin
 128  Jimmy White
 128  Sunny Akani
 124  Jack Lisowski
 123  Martin O'Donnell
 121, 107, 106  Lyu Haotian
 121  Tom Ford
 120  Robbie Williams
 118, 116  Ricky Walden
 117  Daniel Wells
 115  Xu Si
 114, 107  Luca Brecel
 113  Matthew Selt
 110, 108, 105  Anthony McGill
 110  Marco Fu
 109  Noppon Saengkham
 109  Fergal O'Brien
 108, 101  Kyren Wilson
 108  Yu Delu
 108  Kurt Maflin
 105  Ashley Hugill
 103  Niu Zhuang
 102, 101  David Gilbert
 102  Mark Williams
 101  Peter Ebdon
 101  Wang Yuchen

Sponsorship and broadcasting 
The event was sponsored by betting company Betway, sponsors of the UK Championship since 2015. The tournament's broadcasters were dependent on country, with the BBC and Eurosport televising across the United Kingdom and Europe respectively. The event was broadcast in China by Superstars Online, and China Central Television. In Hong Kong, NowTV simulcasted the event with additional commentary.

Notes

References 

2017
UK Championship
UK Championship
Sport in York
UK Championship
UK Championship
2010s in York